Zhuqi is a railway station on the Forestry Bureau Alishan Forest Railway line located in Zhuqi Township, Chiayi County, Taiwan. It is the start of the uphill section of the railway line.

History
The station was constructed in 1906-1910 and opened on 1 October 1912. In 1952, the station underwent renovation and turned into what it is today.

Architecture
The station is located 127 meters above sea level. Since the station is the dividing point between the flat and uphill sections of the railway, there is a wye to the east of the station used for moving the locomotive to the back of the train, or to switch the locomotive entirely.

See also
 List of railway stations in Taiwan

References

1912 establishments in Taiwan
Alishan Forest Railway stations
Railway stations in Chiayi County
Railway stations opened in 1912